Solage (or Soulage), possibly Jean , was a French composer, and probably also a poet.  He composed the most pieces in the Chantilly Codex, the principal source of music of the ars subtilior, the manneristic compositional school centered on Avignon at the end of the century.

Life 
Nothing is known about Solage's life, beyond what can be inferred from the texts to his music. Even his name is a puzzle. One possibility is that the single name "Solage" is a nickname or pseudonym, similar to others known from the period, such as Grimace or Hasprois. "Solage" and "soulage" are variant spellings of Old French solaz, solace, meaning "consolation", "joy", or "entertainment". In the refrain to the text of Calextone qui fut dame, the composer refers to himself with such a double meaning, using the spelling "soulage". However, the possibility that it is a genuine name cannot be ruled out. There are many references from that time to people called Jean Soulas (a name still found in modern times), and the surname Soulage or Soulages also existed (for example, Guillaume de Soulages, count of Canillac, documented from a wedding in 1392), though there are no clear candidates for the composer. Gilbert Reaney's suggestion that the composer's first name might have been Charles rested on a speculative identification of Solage with another composer found in the Chantilly Codex, Goscalch, "a rather German-sounding name" that might be an anagram of "Ch. Solag(e)". However, Reaney's claim that the name occurs nowhere apart from the Chantilly Codex has been proven wrong, as several other identifications have been found, and the possible identity of the two composers has been rejected.

Specific references in the texts of some of his songs indicate he probably was associated with the French royal court. The ballade S'aincy estoit glorifies Jean, duc de Berry, and was written to celebrate his second marriage, to Jeanne de Boulogne, which took place with great pomp near Avignon on 25 May 1389. The pair of ballades, Corps femenin par vertu de nature and Calextone qui fut dame also refer to Jeanne de Boulogne, and their texts show that the former was composed shortly before and the latter shortly after this wedding. Although it is tempting to suppose that Solage might have been in the service of the duke of Berry, it is just as likely that he was in the service of Gaston Fébus, compte de Foix, who had a considerable financial interest in this marriage.

There is also a possible connection to, or at least an indication of some cultural exchange with the court of Giangaleazzo Visconti, the Duke of Milan, in the text of Solage's virelai, Joieux de Cuer. The Visconti family motto, "'a bon droit", is prominently placed at the beginning of the ninth line, at the beginning of the reprise of the first musical section, and just before the return of the refrain. Although Giangaleazzo died in 1402, his daughter Valentina continued to employ the motto  until her death in 1408. In his chanson Pluseurs gens Solage mentioned Jacqueline, the granddaughter of Philippe, Duke of Burgundy, who was born in 1401 and betrothed in 1403. The association with Jacqueline is conjectural, however, since the name  actually found in Pluseurs gens is "Jaquete".

Poetry
Because the texts of Solage's songs are found only in his musical settings, and because they show amongst them kindred turns of phrase as well as syntactic and lexical preferences that lend a sense of unity, it is probable that he wrote the words as well as the music. Other composers represented in the Chantilly Codex were also likely poet-composers, in particular Jacob Senleches.

One especially plain example of textual interrelationships concerns the two ballades Corps femenin and Calextone qui fut. The former is based on the acrostic CATHELLINE LA ROYNE DAMOURS, and the latter begins with what could be the same acrostic, CATHELLI ..., but the second and third stanzas of this ballade are not preserved. There are no other surviving examples of such twin ballades in the literature of this period.

Music

Stylistically, Solage's works exhibit two distinctly different characters: a relatively simple one usually associated with his great predecessor and elder contemporary Guillaume de Machaut, and a more recherché one, complex in the areas of both pitch and rhythm, characteristic of the ars subtilior ("more subtle art"). These two styles mostly exist separately in different songs but sometimes are found mixed in a single composition, where they can be used to underscore the musical and poetic structure. In his simpler "Machaut" style pieces Solage nevertheless makes many personal choices that are very different from what Machaut typically does. Moreover, the simpler style is not necessarily an indication of an earlier date nor the complex style a reliable sign of a later date. Solage uses his techniques to link text and music together, either in terms of form or else of meaning. Nevertheless, some of his ars subtilior music was quite experimental: the best-known example in this complex style is his bizarre Fumeux fume par fumée (approx: "The smoky one smokes through [or for] smoke"), which is extravagantly chromatic for the time; it also contains some of the lowest tessitura vocal writing in any music of the period.

Solage's rondeau is associated with a putative literary school of fumeurs. There have been many interpretations of this sobriquet.  Although it is tempting given the outré nature of some poems to suppose that it refers to the smoking of some drug, the simplest explanation in the case of the above work is that it was written for the Parisian Fumeurs, the Society of Smokers, "an eccentric literary clique of ostentatiously dressed bohemians that named themselves after Jean Fumeux and flourished in the 1360s and 1370s".  One scholar suggests that Eustache Deschamps's poetry, which contains most of the surviving references to the fumeurs, was satirical. The literature associated with the Fumeurs is dated between 1366 and 1381, and Solage's ballade  also alludes to them. In his Règles de la seconde rhétorique Deschamps claims to be the nephew of Machaut, and in his Ballade 447 states that Machaut "brought me up and did me many kindnesses". Though there is no independent verification of these claims, it seems likely that they must have been on close terms. On the other hand, if indeed the Fumeurs were literally devotees of smoking, since tobacco was not known in Europe for another two centuries, some other drug, e.g. hashish or opium, must have been implied.  However, the current consensus among musicologists is that there was no physical smoking. In the Middle Ages, the French expression "" (having smoke in the brain) referred to mental confusion, a condition attributed to internal vapours which, according to ancient authorities such as Hippocrates and Aristotle, could be evacuated from "heated and smoky brains" either by sneezing or by drinking. Similarly, drinking in the morning was referred to as "abattre le brouillard"—"breaking up the fog".

Works
All of Solage's known compositions are found in the Chantilly Codex, and only one of these is found anywhere else. This is the four-voiced ballade , which was obviously copied from Chantilly into the important Florentine manuscript Florence, Bibl. Nazionale, Panciatichi 26, only without its text and lacking identification of its composer. Only ten works are inscribed with Solage's name in the Chantilly Codex (one of them, is found there twice), but two more can be attributed to him on stylistic grounds. These twelve works consist of 9 ballades, 2 virelais and a rondeau:
  (ballade, 4 voices, Ch no. 79)
  (ballade, 3 voices, Ch no. 80)
  (ballade, 3 voices, Ch no. 24)
  (ballade, 3 voices, Ch no. 17)
  (rondeau, 3 voices, Ch no. 98)
  (ballade, 4 voices, Ch no. 95)
  (virelai, 4 voices, Ch no. 97)
  (ballade, 4 voices, Ch no. 96)
  (ballade, 3 voices, Ch no. 50)
  (virelai, 3 voices, Ch no. 13 & 81)
Anonymous in the source, but attributable on stylistic grounds:
  (ballade, 3 voices, Ch no. 74)
  (ballade, 3 voices, Ch no. 22)
All of Solage's works have been recorded by Gothic Voices on the Avie Records label.

Recordings
 The Ars nova. Cappella Cordina, Alejandro Planchart, conductor. Music of the Middle Ages 9; LP recording 1 disc, 33⅓ rpm, 12 in., stereo; Musical Heritage Society MHS 899 (New York: Musical Heritage Society, 1969) (Rondeau: "Fumeux fume par fumée"). Also released on Expériences Anonymes EAS 83 ([New York]: Expériences Anonymes, 1969).
 The Art of Courtly Love; The Early Music Consort of London, David Munrow, dir.; LP recording, 3 discs, stereo; EMI/HMV SLS 863 (86301, 86302, 86303) (London: EMI Records Limited, 1973) (Ballade: "Helas! Je voy mon cuer"; Rondeau: "Fumeux fume par fumée"). French issue as Chansons d'amour courtois de Guillaume de Machaut à Guillaume Dufay; 3-LP set, La voix de son maître 2C16705410, 2C16705411, 2C16705412 (Paris: Pathé Marconi EMI, 1974).
 Beauté parfaite: L'automne du Moyen Âge: chansons des XIVe et XVe siècles; Alla Francesca; CD recording, 1 disc, stereo; Opus 111 OPS 30-173 (Paris: Opus 111, 1997) (Rondeau: "Fumeux fume par fumée").
 Cesena: Songs for Popes, Princes and Mercenaries, c. 1400. Graindelavoix, Björn Schmelzer, director. Recorded in Eglise de Franc-Waret, Belgium, August 2011. CD recording, 1 disc, stereo. Glossa Platinum GCD P32106 (San Lorenzo de El Escorial, Spain: Glossa Platinum, 2011)  ("Corps femenin"; Rondeau: "Fumeux fume par fumée")
 Codex Chantilly: Airs de cour du XIVe siècle; Ensemble Organum, Marcel Pérès, dir. Recorded September 1986; CD recording, 1 disc, stereo; Harmonia Mundi France HMC 901252 (Arles: Harmonia Mundi s. a., 1987) (Rondeau: "Fumeux fume par fumée").
 Codex Chantilly: en l'amoureux vergier. Ensemble de Caelis, Laurence Brisset, director; Recorded at Église Notre-Dame de Centeilles, Siran 13–16 April 2010; CD recording, 1 disc, stereo; Æon AECD 1099 (Paris: Æon, 2010) ("Corps femenin"; "Fumeux fume par fumée"; "Calextone qui fut"; "En l'amoureux vergier").
 Codex Chantilly. Vol. 1. Tetraktys: Jill Feldman, voice; Carlos Mena, voice; Marta Graziolino, harp; Silvia Tecardi, vielle; Kees Boeke, vielle, flute, and direction. Recorded at Pieve de San Pietro a Presciano, Arezzo 12–15 February 2097. CD recording, 1 disc, stereo. Et'cetera KTC 1900. ([Pergine Valdarno, Italy]: Olive Music; [Amsterdam]: Et'cetera, 2008) (Ballade: "").
 Codex Chantilly. Vol. 2. Tetraktys, Kees Boeke, director. Recorded at Pieve de San Pietro a Presciano, Arezzo 23–25 January and 2–4 May 2010. CD recording, 1 disc, stereo. Olive Music KTC 1905 ([Pergine Valdarno, Italy]: Olive Music; [Amsterdam]: Et'cetera, 2011) (Ballade: "En l'amoureux vergier"; Virelai: "Tres gentil cuer").
 Corps femenin: l'avant-garde de Jean Duc de Berry. Ferrara Ensemble, Crawford Young, director. Recorded at Chiesa di St. Germanus, Seewen, Switzerland, 22–25 March 2000, 7 December 2008, and 16 February 2009. CD recording, 1 disc, stereo; Arcana A 355 ([Omegna (VB), Italy]: Arcana, 2010) ("Corps femenin"; "Calextone qui fut").
 Febus Avant! Music at the Court of Gaston Febus (1331–1391); Huelgas Ensemble, Paul Van Nevel; Recorded in the Chapel of the Irish College, Leuven, Belgium, 25–28 October 1991; CD recording, 1 disc, stereo; Vivarte Sony Classical SK 48195 ([Germany]: Sony Classical GmbH, 1992) (#6: Rondeau: "Fumeux fume par fumée").
 Fleurs de vertus: chansons subtiles à la fin du XIVe siècle; Ferrara Ensemble, Crawford Young, director. Recorded at l'Église S. Germanus de Seewen (Soleure), 8–11 January 1996; CD recording, 1 disc, stereo. Arcana A 40 ([France]: Arcana, 1996) (""; Virelai: "Tres gentil cuer").
 French Music of the Gothic Era; Deller Consort, Alfred Deller, director; Concentus Musicus, Wien; with ensemble of ancient instruments. LP recording, 1 disc, 33⅓ rpm, 12 in., stereo; Bach Guild BGS-70656 (New York: Bach Guild, 1964) ("Pluseurs gens voy";"Helas je voy")
 A Golden Treasury of Mediæval Music; Sine Nomine Ensemble for Medieval Music. Recorded at Valley Recordings, Littleton-on-Severn, July 1995. CD recording, 1 disc, stereo. Amon Ra CD-SAR-63 (Wotton-under-Edge, Glostershire: Amon Ra, 1996) ("Corps femenin"). Reissued, CD recording, Musical Heritage Society 15230M (Oakhurst, NJ: Musical Heritage Society, 1998).
 Guillaume Dufay und seine Zeit; Syntagma Musicum, Kees Otten, director; Alte Werk; LP recording, 2 discs, 33⅓ rpm, 12 in.; Telefunken 6.35257 ([Germany]: Telefunken, 1974) (Rondeau: "Fumeux fume par fumee")
 Johannes Ciconia and His Time; Little Consort, Kees Boeke, director; Recorded in the Cattedrale SS Pietro e Paolo, Sovana, Italy, June 1988; CD recording, 1 disc, stereo; Channel Classics CCS 0290 (Amsterdam, Holland: Channel Classics, 1990) ("Hélas, je voy").
 Lancaster and Valois – French and English Music 1350–1420; Gothic Voices, Christopher Page (dir.); Recorded in Boxgrove Priory, Chichester, 11–13 December 1991; CD recording, 1 disc, stereo; Hyperion CDA66588 (London: Hyperion Records Limited, 1992). (Virelai: "Tres gentil cuer")
 Masters, Monsters & Mazes: Treading the Medieval Labyrinth. Trefoil. Recorded at Martel Recital Hall, Vassar College, Poughkeepsie, NY, 4–5 June 2005; CD recording, 1 disc, stereo. MSR Classics MS 1095 (Elmsford, NY: MSR Classics, 2005) (Ballade: "Le basile").
 Medée fu: ballades e ballate: música francesa e italiana de finales del siglo XIV. Tritonus XIV. Recorded Madrid, May 2001. CD recording, 1 disc, stereo. Verso VRS 2005 (Madrid: Verso, 2001) (Rondeau: "Fumeux fume par fumée")
 The Medieval Romantics – French Songs and Motets 1340–1440; Gothic Voices, Christopher Page (dir.); Recorded in the Hospital of St Cross, Winchester, 3–5 October 1990 and 14 May 1991; CD recording, 1 disc, stereo; Hyperion CDA66463 (London: Hyperion Records Limited, 1991). (Virelai: "")
 Music of the Hundred Years War. Musica Reservata, John Beckett, director. LP recording, 1 disc, 33⅓ rpm, 12 in.. stereo, [(S.l.]: Philips, 1968) ("S'aincy estoit que ne feust la noblesce").
 The Passion of Reason: The Sour Cream Legacy; Sour Cream; Recorded June 1993 and July 1994; CD recording, 2 discs, stereo; Glossa GCD 921102 ([n.p.]: Glossa Music SL, 1997) (Rondeau: "Fumeux fume par fumée").
 Project Ars Nova: Ars Magis Subtiliter: Secular Music of the Chantilly Codex; Ensemble P. A. N.; Recorded at Wellesley Chapel, Wellesley, MA, 20–22 July 1987; CD recording, 1 disc, stereo; New Albion Records NA 021 CD (San Francisco: New Albon Records, Inc., 1989) (Rondeau: "Fumeux fume par fumée")
 The Study of Love – French Songs and Motets of the 14th Century; Gothic Voices, Christopher Page (dir.); Recorded in Boxgrove Priory, West Sussex, 29 and 30 April, and 1 May 1992; CD recording, 1 disc, stereo;  Hyperion CDA66619 (London: Hyperion Records Limited, 1992). (Ballade: "Le basile")
 Très gentil cuer: Höfische Musik des späten Mittelalters. Fortuna Canta. Recorded at the Rolf-Liebermann-Studio, NDR, Hamburg, 9–10 January 2003. CD recording, 1 disc, stereo. Ars Produktion ARS 38 489 ([Ratingen]: Ars Produktion, 2009) ("Tres gentil cuer"). 
 The Unknown Lover – Songs by Solage and Machaut; Gothic Voices; Recorded St. Andrew's Church, Toddington, Gloucestershire, England 20–22 February 2006; CD recording, 1 disc, stereo; AVIE AV2089 ([London]: Avie Records, 2006) (#1, 3, 5, 6, 7, 11, 12, 13, 17, 19: Ballade: "Le basile", "Calextone qui fut", "Corps femenin", "En l'amoureux vergier", Rondeau: "Fumeux fume par fumée", "Hélas je voy", "Joieux de cuer", "Pluseurs gens voy", "S'aincy estoit". "Tres gentil cuer", and two anonymous pieces, possibly by Solage as well).
 Zodiac – Ars Nova and Ars Subtilior in the Low Countries and Europe; Capilla Flamenca. Eufoda 1360 (2004).

Notes

References

Sources

Further reading

 Apel, Willi. 1946–47. "The French Secular Music of the Late Fourteenth Century". Acta Musicologica 18–19:17–29.
 Apel, Willi. 1973. "The Development of French Secular Music during the Fourteenth Century". Musica Disciplina 27:41–59.
 Berger, Christian. 1996. "Solages Ballade Calextone und die Grenzen des Tonsystems". In Modality in the Music of the Fourteenth and Fifteenth Centuries/ Modalität in der Musik des 14. und 15. Jahrhunderts, edited by Ursula Günther, Ludwig Finscher, and Jeffrey J. Dean, 75–91. Musicological Studies and Documents 49. Neuhausen-Stuttgart: American Institute of Musicology; Hänssler Verlag. 
 Gómez, Ma Carmen. 1987. "La Musique a la Maison Royale de Navarre a la fin du Moyen-âge et le Chantre Johan Robert". Musica Disciplina 41 (1380-1430: An International Style?): 109–51.
 Günther, Ursula. 1960a. "Die Anwendung der Diminution in der Handschrift Chantilly 1047". Archiv für Musikwissenschaft 17, No.1:1–21.
 Günther, Ursula. 1960b. "Der Gebrauch des tempus perfectum diminutum in der Handschrift Chantilly 1047". Archiv für Musikwissenschaft 17, no. 4:277–97.
 Günter, Ursula. 1961. "Datierbare Balladen des späten 14. Jahrhunderts, I". Musica Disciplina 15:39–61.
 Günther, Ursula. 1963. "Die Musiker des Herzogs von Berry". Musica Disciplina 17:79–91, 93–95.
 Günther, Ursula. 1991. "Die Ars subtilior des späten 14. Jahrhunderts". In Für György Ligeti. Die Referate des Ligeti-Kongresses 1988, edited by Constantin Floros, 277–88. Hamburger Jahrbuch fur Musikwissenschaft 11. Laaber: Laaber-Verlag. 
 Günther, Ursula. 1996. "Calextone von Solage: Ein ungewöhnliches Werk". In Modality in the Music of the Fourteenth and Fifteenth Centuries/ Modalität in der Musik des 14. und 15. Jahrhunderts, edited by Ursula Günther, Ludwig Finscher, and Jeffrey J. Dean, 65–74. Musicological Studies and Documents 49. Neuhausen-Stuttgart: American Institute of Musicology; Hänssler Verlag. 
 Hirshberg, Jehoash. 1971. "The Music of the Late Fourteenth Century: A Study in Musical Style". Ph.D. diss. Philadelphia: University of Pennsylvania.
 Hoppin, Richard H. 1978. Medieval Music.  New York, W.W. Norton & Co., 1978.  
 Josephson, Nors S. 1986. "Intersectional Relationships in the French 'Grande Ballade'". Musica Disciplina 40:79–97.
 Josephson, Nors S. 2003–2008. "Many Roads Lead to Rome: Multifarious Stylistic Tendencies and Their Musical Interrelationships within the 'Ars Subtilior'". Musica Disciplina 53:71–97.
 Story, Christina Maria Nest. 2008. "Music and Musicians in the Court and City of Paris During the Reign of Charles VI (1380–1422)". PhD diss. London: Royal Holloway, University of London. 
 Unruh, Patricia 1983. "'Fumeur' Poetry and Music of the Chantilly Codex: A Study of Its Meaning and Background". MA thesis. Vancouver: University of British Columbia.
 
  Reprinted in Wilkins, Nigel E. (2011). "Words and Music in Medieval Europe". Farnham: Ashgate. 8: 40–84.

External links
 
 
 Opoudjis. 2010. "Solage: Calextone qui fut dame terrouse". Opoudjis His Blog (22 February) (accessed 24 February 2014).

14th-century French composers
French classical composers
French male classical composers
Ars subtilior composers
14th-century births
15th-century deaths
15th-century French composers
Medieval male composers